The 6532 RAM-I/O-Timer (RIOT) was an integrated circuit made by MOS Technology, as well as second sources such as Rockwell. It incorporated 128 bytes of static RAM, two bidirectional 8-bit digital input/output ports, and a Programmable interval timer. This high degree of integration made it quite popular in the late 1970s and early 1980s, as it could take the place of several different integrated circuits (ICs). 

Perhaps its best-known application was the Atari 2600 video game console. The chip was also famously deployed in Gottlieb pinball machines, such as Haunted House and Black Hole, the Atari 810 and 1050 disk drives, as well as Commodore's 8050, 8250 & 8250LP PET disk drives. The Atari 850 Interface, which gave Atari 400 and 800 computers an RS-232 interface, used two 6532 chips.

6532 ICs were available in 1 MHz and 2 MHz versions. The form factor was a JEDEC-standard, 40-pin DIP (ceramic or plastic).

External links
6532 Datasheet (MOS) (GIF format, zipped)
6532 Datasheet (Rockwell) (PDF format)

MOS Technology integrated circuits